Cometicercus is an extinct genus of thelodont which lived in Canada during the Early Devonian period.

It is only known from its caudal fin and parts of its dorsal surface, including its dorsal fin.

References

External links 
 

Thelodonti genera
Devonian jawless fish
Extinct animals of Canada